Rikan (also Romanized as Rīkān) is a village in Howmeh Rural District, in the Central District of Garmsar County, Semnan Province, Iran. At the 2006 census, its population was 354, in 100 families.

References 

Populated places in Garmsar County